Radio Guangdong is a provincially-owned radio station in Guangdong, owns nine radio channels and two newspapers. Radio Guangdong is a part of Guangdong Radio and Television, and is a member of World Radio Network.

History
Radio Guangdong started as Radio Canton, a radio station in Canton, the capital city of Guangdong Province. It first broadcast on 18 October 1949 and was renamed "Radio Guangdong" on 16 February 1950. Radio Guangdong was also the first radio station among Chinese Radio Industry to set up an Internet website which was started on 15 December 1996.

Radio channels

Newspapers
 Sheng Bao (lit. voice paper, former , lit. Guangdong Broadcast News)
 Gushi Kuaibao (lit. Stock Market News)

External links
 Radio Guangdong 

Chinese-language radio stations
Mandarin-language radio stations
Cantonese-language radio stations
Radio stations in China
Mass media in Guangzhou